Nower Wood is a   nature reserve south-west of Leatherhead in Surrey. It is managed by the Surrey Wildlife Trust.

Nower Wood has no public access, and is an educational reserve which hosts classrooms and children's events. It is mainly ancient oak woodland with areas of hazel coppice, chalk grassland, heath and artificial ponds which are used for pond dipping. There is a variety of birds such as woodcock and wood warbler.

References

Surrey Wildlife Trust